Eddie Jack Jordan may refer to:

 Eddie Jordan (attorney) (born 1952), American attorney 
 Eddie Jack Jordan (artist) (1925–1999), African American artist